Julian Peto  is an English statistician and cancer epidemiologist at the London School of Hygiene and Tropical Medicine. He was Cancer Research UK Chair of Epidemiology at the Institute of Cancer Research from 1983 until 2010. From 1974 to 1983 he worked as a research scientist under Sir Richard Doll at the University of Oxford.

He was educated at Taunton's School in Southampton,  Balliol College, Oxford and Imperial College, London.
His brother Richard Peto, with whom he has published work in mathematical statistics (see the logrank test), is also a distinguished epidemiologist.

His research interests include the epidemiology of asbestos induced cancers, the epidemiology and genetics of breast cancer, and HPV screening to prevent cervical cancer.

References

Living people
Cancer epidemiologists
English statisticians
Alumni of Balliol College, Oxford
Alumni of Imperial College London
Year of birth missing (living people)
Academics of the London School of Hygiene & Tropical Medicine